Uroš Bregar (born 22 February 1979) is a Slovenian handball coach who is the head coach of Siófok KC and the Serbia women's national team.

References

1979 births
Living people
Slovenian handball coaches
Handball coaches of international teams
Slovenian expatriate sportspeople in Serbia
Slovenian expatriate sportspeople in Hungary